Squads for the Football at the 1982 Asian Games played in New Delhi, India.

Group A

Head coach:

Saudi Arabia

Head coach:  Mario Zagalo

Head coach:

Head coach:  Peter Schnittger

Group B

Head coach:

Head coach:  Ammo Baba

Head coach:

Head coach:  Rudi Gutendorf

Group C

Head coach:  Gerd Schmidt

Head coach:  Nian Weisi

Head coach:  P. K. Banerjee

Head coach:

Group D

Head coach:  Jalal Cheraghpour

Head coach:  Takaji Mori

Head coach:  Choi Eun-taek

Head coach:

References

External links
https://web.archive.org/web/20110722141522/http://rdfc.com.ne.kr/int/skor-intres-1980.html

1982
squads